Sumathi En Sundari is a 1971 Indian Tamil-language romantic comedy film, directed by C. V. Rajendran. The film stars Sivaji Ganesan and Jayalalithaa. It is a remake of the 1967 Bengali film Nayika Sangbad. The film was released on 14 April 1971.

Plot

Cast 
Sivaji Ganesan as Madhu
Jayalalithaa as Sumathi / Sundari
V. Gopalakrishnan as Director Chinnasamy
K. A. Thangavelu as Rathnasamy
Nagesh as Mannangatti Sundaram
Sachu as Sachu / Saraswathi
Thengai Srinivasan as Paramanandam
Senthamarai as Railway Station Master
Vennira Aadai Moorthy as Moorthy
Jayakumari as Dancer
Gundu Karuppaiah as Iyer
S. N. Parvathy as Parvathi
Gemini Maali as the film producer

Production
The filming was completely held at Kodaikanal. Rajendran wanted two horses for an important scene however after he found one of the two horses to be skinny and rides only in reverse he decided not to change the horse as it would become difficult to obtain the call sheets of Ganesan so he shot the scene with Nagesh riding in skinny horse and Ganesan riding a much healthier horse converting into a humorous scene.

Soundtrack 
The music was composed by M. S. Viswanathan. "Pottu Vaitha Mugamo" is the first song that S. P. Balasubrahmanyam sang for a Ganesan film; another man was originally to sing the song, but Viswanathan chose Balasubrahmanyam.

Release and reception 
Sumathi En Sundari was released on 14 April 1971. T. G. Vaidyanathan of Film World appreciated the film.

References

External links 
 

1971 romantic comedy films
1970s Tamil-language films
1971 films
Films directed by C. V. Rajendran
Films scored by M. S. Viswanathan
Films with screenplays by Chitralaya Gopu
Indian romantic comedy films
Tamil remakes of Bengali films